Eric Stuurman (born 21 January 1965) is a Dutch wheelchair tennis player. He won the bronze medal together with Ricky Molier in the men's doubles event in wheelchair tennis at the 1996 Summer Paralympics.

Robin Ammerlaan and Stuurman won the silver medal in the men's doubles event at the 2000 Wheelchair Tennis Masters.

In 2008, Stuurman competed in the wheelchair men's singles event at the 2008 Australian Open held in Melbourne, Australia. Stuurman and also Maikel Scheffers also competed in the wheelchair men's doubles event at the 2008 Australian Open.

References

External links
 
 

1965 births
Living people
Wheelchair tennis players
Paralympic wheelchair tennis players of the Netherlands
Wheelchair tennis players at the 1996 Summer Paralympics
Wheelchair tennis players at the 2000 Summer Paralympics
Wheelchair tennis players at the 2004 Summer Paralympics
Wheelchair tennis players at the 2008 Summer Paralympics
Medalists at the 1996 Summer Paralympics
Paralympic bronze medalists for the Netherlands
Paralympic medalists in wheelchair tennis
20th-century Dutch people
21st-century Dutch people